Helena Skłodowska-Szalay (also known as Helena Szalayowa; 20 April 1866, Warsaw — 6 February 1961) was a Polish educator, inspector of Warsaw schools, educational activist, and a member of the women's election committee of the Nation-State Union political party. She is known for her memoirs of her sister, Marie Curie, and the school she established for girls in Warsaw.

Life
Helena was born 20 April 1866 in Warsaw to Władysław Skłodowski and Bronisława Skłodowska, both of whom were teachers. She had three sisters — Zofia, Bronisława, and Marie, and a brother, Józef. Her parents were Polish nationalists, impoverished by their investments towards independence from Russia, especially the January Uprising of 1863-65, and the family lived in straitened circumstances. After her father was dismissed by the Russian authorities for his nationalist sentiment, the Skłodowskis had to take in boarders to supplement their income. After Marie was born in 1867, their mother retired from running a girls' boarding school in Warsaw. In 1875, her oldest sister Zofia died of typhus contracted from a lodger, and their mother succumbed to tuberculosis in 1878.

Helena attended Jadwiga Sikorska's school in Warsaw, and obtained a governess diploma. She taught mathematics at the Hoffmanowa high school. Socially active, in her youth she belonged to the underground organization 'Kolo Kobiet Korony i Litwy, whose goal was to educate young workers and raise funds for political support. Through her contacts in the wealthy community whose children she minded, she was also involved in amateur drama, and even considered becoming a professional actor herself.

As tertiary education became restricted under Russian rule, especially for women, Helena with her sisters had to attend the Flying University, a clandestine organisation for higher studies, in Warsaw.

In 1891, Bronisława got married in Paris. Among the attendees at the civil ceremony was Stanislas Szalay, a chemist, who would become Helena's husband. By 1894, Marie had graduated from Sorbonne and was considering a return to Poland; she was interested in joining the Jagiellonian University in Krakow. Anticipating this, Helena, who was a private tutor for the Bujwid family, which moved to Krakow in 1893, wrote to the Faculty of Philosophy at the Jagiellonian, asking if she could attend lectures in inorganic chemistry and experimental physics. The request was denied in 1894.

That same year, the Second Congress of Educators of the Kingdom of Poland was held. Polish-language education was only occurring in the Austro-Hungarian part of the country, while the rest had enforced Russian-medium education. The question of women's secondary and post-secondary education was raised. Helena, along with Paulina Kuczalska-Reinschmit, Stefania Sempołowska and others, presented her views. The committee's views were adopted in the final resolutions of the congress.

In 1896, Helena married Stanislas Szalay. Their daughter Hanna was born the following year.

By 1913, she was a headmistress of a school run on behalf of the employees of the Warsaw trams. She established and operated several primary schools in the 1920s and 1930s, concentrating on the systematic learning and preparing the students for secondary gymnasiums. Thereafter she became a schools inspector.

Stanislas Szalay, who suffered for years from psychological illness, died in January 1920.

After the Second World War, Helena continued to teach for several more years till past the age of 80. In her old age, her granddaughter Elżbieta Staniszkis lived with and looked after her.

Helena, along with her siblings Bronisława and Josef, had collected papers, letters and other archival material in connection with their sister Marie, and stored them at Warsaw's Radium Institute. Most of these were lost during the Warsaw Uprising. She managed to publish Ze Wspomnień o Marii Skłodowskiej-Curie, her memoir of her scientist sister, in 1958.

Helena Skłodowska-Szalay died on 6 February 1961.

References

Bibliography
 
 
 
 
 
 
 
 
 
 
 
 

1866 births
1961 deaths
Schoolteachers from Warsaw
Polish governesses
People from Warsaw Governorate